Pakistan is home to 108 peaks above 7,000 metres and 4555 above 6,000 m. There is no count of the peaks above 5,000 and 4,000 m. Five of the 14 highest independent peaks in the world (the eight-thousanders) are in Pakistan (four of which lie in the surroundings of Concordia; the confluence of Baltoro Glacier and Godwin Austen Glacier). Most of the highest peaks in Pakistan lie in the Karakoram mountain range (which lies almost entirely in the Gilgit–Baltistan region of Pakistan, and is considered to be a separate range from Himalayan range) but some peaks above 7,000 m are included in the Himalayan and Hindu Kush ranges. Moreover, Pakistan is home to over 7,000 glaciers,  more than anywhere except the polar regions.

Considerations

The list is an incomplete list of mountains in Pakistan. There are many named and unnamed peaks in Pakistan that are currently not included in this list. The list also includes many peaks that are not usually classed as independent mountains, but instead are considered sub-peaks of other mountains, due to having low topographic prominence (the height of a peak above the highest saddle connecting it to a higher summit). Also, many of the elevations listed are approximate, due to imprecise and inconsistent surveys. The ranks in the peaks above  are derived from the list of highest mountains.

The dividing line between a mountain with multiple peaks and separate mountains is not always clear (see Highest unclimbed mountain). A common threshold is to define a mountain as a summit with 300 m prominence (1,000 ft; also 10 traditional rope lengths). Alternatively, a relative prominence (prominence or height) is used (usually 7–8%) to reflect that in higher mountain ranges everything is on a larger scale. The list of highest mountains ranks the highest 100 summits with at least 500 m prominence, approximating a 7% relative prominence. A drawback of a prominence-based list is that it may exclude peaks commonly thought of as mountains that are connected via a high ridge to a taller summit. Many such peaks and mountains with less than sufficient prominence are included but not numbered in the list.

It is very unlikely that all the heights given are correct to the nearest meter; indeed, problems of definition of sea level can arise when a mountain is remote from the sea. Different sources often differ by many meters, and many mountains in the Karakorum differ by over 100 metres on different maps. These discrepancies serve to emphasise the uncertainties in the listed heights.

Geographical distribution

Most of the highest mountains in Pakistan are located in the Karakoram range (the highest of which is K2, globally ranked 2nd, 8611m), some high mountains are in Himalaya (the highest of which is Nanga Parbat, globally ranked 9th, 8126 m) and Hindu Kush (the highest of which is Tirich Mir, globally ranked 33rd, 7708 m).

The locations of the highest mountains are shown on the composite satellite image of Karakoram and Hindu Kush below. The numbers refer to the global ranking in this "List of highest mountains". For clarity, lower peaks with labels overlapping higher peaks are left out of the main image.

Most of the high peaks in Pakistan lie specifically in Gilgit–Baltistan with the exception of a few 7,000+ m peaks in the high Hindu Kush (the peaks marked in the northwest most region of Pakistan).

The peak marked as number 9 is Nanga Parbat (8,125 m), which is the 2nd highest Himalayan peak in Pakistan. All other peaks above 8,000m are in the Baltoro Muztagh subrange of Karakoram.

8000+ meters

7000 to 8000 meters

6000 to 7000 meters

5000 to 6000 meters

4000 to 5000 meters

3000 to 4000 meters

See also 

 List of Pakistani administrative divisions by highest elevation 
 Gilgit-Baltistan
 List of highest mountains on Earth
 List of mountain ranges of Pakistan
 List of mountain ranges of the world
 Lists of mountains by region

Notes
  Stated in the Pakistan Trekking Guide, by Isobel and Ben Shaw (along with the list of highest peaks of Pakistan in Appendices).
  These ranks are derived from the List of highest mountains. Many peaks and mountains with less than sufficient prominence are included but not numbered in the list (see #Considerations.
  The elevation of Hachindar Chhish given here is disputed by both Austrian and Russian topographic mapping, which give it 6870 m and 6765 m respectively.

References

Sources 
 "High Asia: An Illustrated History of the 7,000 Metre Peaks" by Jill Neate (Mountaineers Books 1990)
 Soviet military 1:100,000 topographic maps (most from 1980–1981)
 The "High Mountain Info" section of the "High Mountain Sports Magazine" (1990–2005) (now Climb Magazine)

External links 

 Peakware.com
 Summitpost.org
 Blankonthemap
 Digital elevation data, including much of High Asia
 Discussion of frequently misquoted elevations
 Prominence lists (including all Asian mountains with >1,450m prominence)
 Hispar Area
 "Johnmap2001" - KKH maps
 Google Earth / Keyhole BBS Post (all peaks above 7000 m)
 LAS Maps - (LUMS Adventure Society)
 Northern Pakistan detailed placemarks in Google Earth
 About mountains in Pakistan

 
Mountains